Bealbonn is an extinct genus of early shark from the Carboniferous. It is known by a singular species, B. rogaire. It is known from the Serpukhovian-aged lagerstätte of the Bear Gulch Limestone of Montana, United States. It is one of the genera included in the early shark family Gregoriidae.

References

Carboniferous
Sharks
Prehistoric cartilaginous fish genera